Georges Bœuf (21 December 1937 – 25 August 2020) was a French composer, musician, and saxophonist. He composed operas and film scores, among others.

Life 
In 1969, he co-founded the Groupe de musique expérimentale de Marseille (GMEM), of which he became president in 1974. In 1988, he founded the composition class at the CRRM, which was first directed by Pierre Barbizet.

Bœuf taught musical training, sound technique, and organology. He composed hundreds of musical works, including for theatrical and cinematic productions. He composed La Chant de la Nature for the permanent exhibition in the National Museum of Natural History in Paris.

Bœuf composed an opera titled Verlaine Paul, based on the work of poet Franck Venaille. It was shown at the Opéra national de Lorraine in Nancy on 29 October 1996, with the baritone François Le Roux in a lead role.

Among his latest works are a string quartet created by the Parisii Quartet, Orbes for 12 strings, premiered by the Orchestre royal de Wallonie, Septimo (1998) for vibraphone and bells, recorded by Frédéric Daumas (Fragrance, 1999), Le Prophète, based on a text by Stéphane Mallarmé, for baritone and piano (1998), premiered by François Le Roux and Alexandre Tharaud at the François Mitterrand Library, Solitaire Vigie for large orchestra and choir (poem by Mallarmé) premiered in Nancy in January 2000, Variasix for instrumental ensemble created by the Télémaque ensemble (Aix-en-Provence, 2001), Koré ou L'Oubli for keyboard-percussion quartet in 2002, created by the Symblêma ensemble, Sonata for violin created by Nicolas Miribel, Six Monodies de l'absence for tenor saxophone, created by Joël Versavaud, Dans le bruit du monde for choir, created by the contemporary Roland Hayrabedian Choir, Messe des cendres.

Georges Bœuf died in Marseille on 25 August 2020 at the age of 82.

Further reading 
 Michel Chion (et al.), "Georges Bœuf", in La musique électroacoustique, Presses universitaires de France, 1982,  
 Golo Föllmer, Roland Frank, Folkmar Hein, Dokumentation elektroakustischer Musik in Europa, Inventionen '92, Berlin, 1992 
 Maurice Hinson et Wesley Roberts, "Georges Bœuf", in Guide to the Pianist's Repertoire, Indiana University Press, 2013 (4th ed. revised),

Sources 
 Encyclopédie Larousse de la Musique, Georges Bœuf
 L'Express, Hervé Godard, Pierre Cardonne, 12 juin 1999, Musique contemporaine: Georges Bœuf et Raphaël de Vivo
 Libération, Frédérique Roussel, 25 juillet 2013, A Chaillol, l’effet Bœuf d’un Giono
 La Croix, 22 juillet 2013, Bruno Serrou, Georges Bœuf, un musicien au pays de Giono.
 Présent continu, Michaël Dian, 3 septembre 2013, Entretien avec Georges Bœuf
 Le Dauphiné libéré, 30 juillet 2014, Georges Bœuf : une motivation formidable''

References

External links 
 
 
 France Culture, 19 août 2014, Le quatuor Béla joue des œuvres d'Igor Stravinsky, Dimitri Chostakovitch, Leos Janacek et Georges Bœuf. 
 Bœuf Georges (1937) (Éléments biographiques on the website of the Centre de documentation de la musique contemporaine)
 
 Filmographie et documents (Ciné-Ressources)

1937 births
2020 deaths
French electronic musicians
French film score composers
French male musicians
French opera composers
French saxophonists
French male film score composers
Male opera composers
Musicians from Marseille
String quartet composers
20th-century saxophonists